Club Deportivo El Vencedor, commonly referred to as El Vencedor,  is a Salvadoran professional football club based at Santa Elena, Usulután Department, El Salvador. They currently play in Tercera Division de Fútbol Salvadoreño,

History
El Vencedor won the Apertura 2018 title, after they defeated Platense 4–1 in penalties after tying in a two-legged series.

This was title was followed with the most glorious event in the club history, as El Vencedor were able to once again defeat San Pablo Tachico (who were the Clausura 2019 Champion) in a promotion playoff 6–5 after penalties, after tying 0–0. Which enabled the club to play in the primera division (the top division in El Salvador) for the first time ever in the club history. 

El Vencedor ownership had reportedly experienced thousands dollars in operating losses since El Vencedor joined the Primera division. The club president Marlon Claros stated that due to a lack of corporate support for the team and the municipality withdrew it support. Following the closure of the shortened 2020 Clausura season due to CO-VID 19 virus pandemic, The club eventually seceded their spot to Atletico Marte .

Honours

Domestic honours
 Segunda División Salvadorean and predecessors 
 Champions (1) : 2018 Apertura
 Promotion Play-off Winners: 2018–2019
 Tercera División Salvadorean and predecessors 
 Champions:(1) : 1977

Stadium
 Estadio José Germán Rivas, Santa Elena (-2019)
 Estadio Jiboa, San Vicente (2019)
 Estadio Sergio Torres (2019–present)
 Estadio Las Delicias, Santa Tecla (2020)

El Vencedor plays its home games at Estadio José Germán Rivas in Santa Elena, Uslutlan. However the club stated the Estadio German Lozano was to small to play in the primera division therefore they moved their games to the bigger Estadio Jiboa. On September, 2019 the club madean agreement with the owners of Luis Angel Firpo to play their home games at Estadio Sergio Torres.

Players

Current squad

Out on loan

In

Out

Players with dual citizenship
   Joel Almeida

Personal

Coaching staff

Management

board of directors

Managerial history

Club records
 First victory in the Primera Division for El Vencedor: 4-0 Once Deportivo,  25 August 2019
 First goalscorer in the Primera Division for El Vencedor: Panamanian Nicolás Muñoz v Isidro Metapan August 10, 2019
 Largest Home victory, Primera División: 2-0 v Alianza, 22 September 2019
 Largest Away victory, Primera División: 4-0 v Once Deportivo,  25 August 2019
 Largest Home loss, Primera División: 0-1 v Once Deportivo,  4 November 2019
 Largest Away loss, Primera División: 0–3 v Aguila, 28 July 2019  1-4 FAS, 28 October 2019 
 Highest home attendance: 3,215 v C.D. Aguila, Primera División,  September 29, 2019  2,000 v Platense, 2018, Segunda Division final
 Highest away attendance: 1,000 v Primera División, San Salvador, TBD, 2019
 Highest average attendance, season: 49,176, Primera División
 Most goals scored, season, Primera División: 28,  TBD, 2019
 Worst season: Segunda Division 2002-2003: 1 loss, 4 draws and 17 losses (7 points)
 Biggest loss: 0–11 Nacional 1906 in 2006 Otra tunda para El Vencedor: 14 de noviembre 2005 .::. El Diario de Hoy

Individual records
 Record appearances (all competitions): TBD, 822 from 1957 to 1975
 Record appearances (Primera Division):  Salvadoran Ramon Lopez and Reinaldo Aparicio, 32 from 2019
 Most capped player for El Salvador: 63 (0 whilst at El Vencedor), Juan Jose Gomez
 Most international caps for El Salvador while an El Vencedor player: 2, Henry Hernandez
 Most caps won whilst at El Vencedor: 2, Henry Hernandez.
 Record scorer in league: TBD, 396
 Most goals in a season (all competitions): TBD, 62 (1927/28) (47 in League, 15 in Cup competitions)
 Most goals in a season (Primera Division): Nicolás Muñoz, 19

Fan base La Furia Tabuda

Notable former players
Players listed below have had junior and/or senior international caps for their respective countries before, while and/or after playing at El Vencedor. 

 Henry Hernandez
 Juan Jose Polio
  Nicolás Muñoz
 Sergio Mendez

References

Football clubs in El Salvador
Association football clubs established in 1921
1921 establishments in El Salvador